Shadowrun Chronicles: Boston Lockdown (originally marketed as Shadowrun Online) was a turn-based tactical video game developed by Cliffhanger Productions and published by Nordic Games as part of Jordan Weisman's cyberpunk Shadowrun fictional universe. With the servers shut down, the game stopped working on November 30, 2018.

Gameplay

Development and release

Following the success of the Shadowrun Returns Kickstarter campaign, Cliffhanger Productions initiated a similar campaign to crowdsource $500,000 in July 2012, and pledged to deliver a closed beta version of Shadowrun Online for contributors around May 2013.

Director's Cut 
Regarding Shadowrun Chronicles: INFECTED Director's Cut, the Director's Cut version combines the two games Shadowrun Chronicles: Boston Lockdown and the INFECTED! campaigns into one game, so other related products were not needed. It was released on Steam on December 10, 2015. A Missions DLC was released for this INFECTED! Director's Cut on February 25, 2016.

Game server shut-down 
On November 30, 2018, the servers were shut down, citing the license running out and the game making barely enough to keep the servers running.  Due to the license only allowing online games, the game needs the servers to work, even in a "play alone" mode using NPCs instead of other players in missions.

Despite different expectations, Microsoft had no interest in renewing the license and "persistent ransomware attacks" had been increasing the cost of running the server.

There is some talk about either having someone else running servers or finding a way to run a server locally for at least the "playing alone" with NPCs part.

Reception

IGN awarded the game a score of 6.5 out of 10, saying "smart co-op partners make Shadowrun Chronicles: Boston Lockdown's tactical combat work, but anything less falls short." It has a 61/100 rating on Metacritic. GameSpot awarded it a score of 3 out of 10, saying "Shadowrun Chronicles isn't just a bad Shadowrun game. It's a bad game. That it comes from a series with such an exceptional pedigree and plenty of exceptional recent successes just makes the disappointment that much more bitter." Shacknews, by contrast, gave it a 7 out of 10, praising the story, setting, strategy, and multiplayer, while criticizing the server issues, incomplete game systems, pointless death timer, and rewards that weren't proportionate to mission difficulty.

References

External links

Shadowrun Online on Kickstarter

2015 video games
Android (operating system) games
IOS games
Kickstarter-funded video games
Linux games
Multiplayer and single-player video games
MacOS games
Ouya games
Shadowrun video games
Video games developed in Austria
Video games set in the 2070s
Windows games
Cliffhanger Productions games